The Q2B siren ("Q-siren") is an electromechanical siren that is produced by the Federal Signal Corporation and is most recognizable for its sound, which is trademarked, and the look of the siren.

History
The mechanical siren was used on police vehicles, ambulances, fire apparatus and other emergency vehicles beginning in the early 1900s.  The first were driven with a hand crank or driven by the vehicles tire or fan belt.  They were manufactured by the Sterling Siren and Fire Alarm Company in Rochester, NY;  B&M in Los Angeles and a few others. Later, electric motor driven sirens were widely manufactured by Federal Signal Corp, Sireno, Sterling and a few others.  Beginning in the late 60's, the electronic siren began to replace the mechanical siren.  It provided several tones (wail and yelp) and a PA option.  The electronic siren did not clog with snow in the winter (NYPD cops would beat the roof mounted siren with their nightsticks to break off the ice.)   Federal Signal emerged as the largest manufacturer and makes, in University Park, IL, the "Q" siren to date.  B&M still makes their "Super Chief" to date in their California facility.  Other US manufacturers include Timberwolf of California which makes a "Timberwolf" siren, and Eagle Sirens of Michigan which makes the "Screaming Eagle" and "Nesting Eagle" sirens.

Tire driven sirens were made by Harley Davidson but became obsolete in 1982 when California required a police motorcycle to be able to emit a siren sound while stopped.  New York City's noise regulations made mechanical sirens obsolete there in the early 1970s; they were too loud and the sound was too widely projected.  The NYPD then used a 58 watt electronic siren with a small roof mounted speaker.  The old roof mounted Federal P660 "Pulsator" sirens were history.

Present day

Today Federal Signal's Q2B siren is still in wide use. The majority of users of the Q Siren are fire departments, although some ambulances and heavy rescue squads have employed the Q-siren. Hearing protection is recommended but not required when operating the siren or for anyone in the truck. The Q2B is mounted outside the truck, usually in the front bumper, on top of an extended front bumper or on the grill. Roof-mounting is no longer common because of noise in the cab.

Controversy
Some fire departments and cities have banned the siren due to its loud volume, which led to them being substituted for electronic replica versions, such as the E-Q2B. Other mechanical sirens like the Super Chief were equipped on some trucks to replace the Q siren. However, electronic versions of the mechanical siren, despite sounding similar to the Q2B, are not as effective as the real Q2B due to their lack of square sound waves produced by a mechanical siren.  The Fire Department of the city of New York has notably banned the siren because of its loudness. For many years FDNY has used the Federal Signal PA300 electronic siren, which then led to them being criticized for sounding more like a police car or an EMS unit than a fire truck. The FDNY then purchased an E-Q2B equipped 2007 Pierce Arrow XT, which was assigned to Rescue 1. Rescue 1 Members have been quoted as saying "the best thing about the new rig is that old fashioned siren that all other trucks have, it really gets your blood pumping hearing that. It's great that we sound like a fire engine again, not a cop car or an EMS unit". The E-Q2B became standard for FDNY units being delivered. Before then, many companies throughout FDNY have placed mechanical sirens on their rigs over the years; however, they were then confiscated during maintenance.

References
                                                               

Fire detection and alarm
Sirens
Sound trademarks
Active fire protection